Oleksandr Valentynovich Shutov (born 12 June 1975) is a retired Ukrainian professional footballer.

Career
He made his professional debut in the Ukrainian First League 1992 in 1992 for FC Chaika Sevastopol. He played 3 games in the 1996–97 UEFA Cup for PFC CSKA Moscow.

Honours
 Russian Premier League runner-up: 1998.
 Belarusian Premier League champion: 2000.

References

External links

1975 births
Living people
Ukrainian footballers
Association football midfielders
Ukrainian expatriate footballers
Expatriate footballers in Russia
Expatriate footballers in Belarus
Russian Premier League players
FC Chayka Sevastopol players
SC Tavriya Simferopol players
FC Zorya Luhansk players
FC Rostov players
PFC CSKA Moscow players
FC Chornomorets Odesa players
FC Chernomorets Novorossiysk players
FC Slavia Mozyr players
FC Amkar Perm players
FC Tom Tomsk players
FC Sevastopol players